The 2020 Caribbean Series (Serie del Caribe) was the 62nd edition of the international competition featuring the champions of the Colombian Professional Baseball League, Dominican Professional Baseball League, Mexican Pacific League, Panamanian Professional Baseball League, Puerto Rican Professional Baseball League, and Venezuelan Professional Baseball League. It took place from February 1 to 7, 2020 at Hiram Bithorn Stadium in San Juan, Puerto Rico.

The 2020 edition marked the first-ever appearance of Colombia in the Series, and therefore featured six teams for the second consecutive year. They replaced Cuba in the circuit, who was unable to compete due to an inability to secure travel visas in time for the competition. 

The Toros del Este of the Dominican Professional Baseball League won the tournament, which was their first Series championship and the 20th overall for the Dominican Republic.

Format
The Preliminary Round consisted of a fifteen-game round robin, after which the top 4 teams advanced to the Semifinal Round (1st vs. 4th, 2nd vs. 3rd). The winners of the semifinal games then squared off in the Final.

Participating teams

Preliminary round

Time zone: Atlantic Standard Time (UTC–4)

Knockout stage

Semi-finals

Final

Awards

References

External links
Caribbean Series on mlb.com

2020
Caribbean Series
Caribbean Series
Caribbean Series
International baseball competitions hosted by Puerto Rico
Caribbean Series
21st century in San Juan, Puerto Rico
Sports in San Juan, Puerto Rico